The 1962 African Cup of Nations was the third edition of the Africa Cup of Nations, the soccer championship of Africa (CAF). It was hosted by Ethiopia. Nine countries entered the competition, including the reigning champions Egypt, meaning for the first time a qualification tournament was required. The finals only included four teams. Egypt, as holders, and Ethiopia as hosts, qualified automatically meaning each needed to play only one game to reach the final. Ethiopia won the tournament for the first time, defeating  UAR 4-2, after extra time in the final.

This tournament has the highest goals-per-game average in Africa Cup of Nations tournaments.

Qualified teams 

This page details the process of qualifying for the 1962 African Cup of Nations. 

Nine nations initially entered the competition, with Ethiopia and Egypt both automatically qualified as hosts and title holders respectively. Sudan withdrew before the draw, and Morocco withdrew before play began, thus leaving five teams vying for the remaining two spots in the finals. This was the first time Sudan did not compete in the tournament.

Squads

Venues

Final tournament

Semifinals

Third place match

Final

Scorers 
3 goals

  Mengistu Worku
  Badawi Abdel Fattah

2 goals
  Girma Tekle
  Luciano Vassalo

1 goal

  Italo Vassalo
  Moncef Chérif
  Mohamed Salah Jedidi
  Chedly Laaouini
  Rached Meddab
  Ammar Merrichkou
  John Bunyenyezi
  Saleh Selim

References

External links 

 Details at RSSSF
 Details at Soccerbot

 
Nations
African Cup of Nations
Sport in Addis Ababa
Africa Cup of Nations tournaments
International association football competitions hosted by Ethiopia
Africa Cup of Nations